James Henry Nixon (1802–1857) was an illustrator and painter during the Victorian period, who worked in the firm Ward and Nixon painting stained glass windows. James Henry Nixon was a protégé of Charles Winston, who praised Nixon's work at Westminster Abbey and Church of Christ the King, Bloomsbury. The company Ward and Nixon was followed by Ward and Hughes.

Career 
The company began in 1836 as Ward and Nixon, when James Henry Nixon (brother of sculptor Samuel Nixon) joined forces with Thomas Ward.  Nixon was a student of John Martin (painter).  From 1826 to 1829, Nixon painted the famous medieval stained glass in the Parish Church of St Neot, Cornwall. After that, Nixon exhibited at the Royal Academy from 1830 to 1847. He exhibited "Solomon's sacrifice" to outstanding reviews (1832) and the following year he exhibited "The resting of the Arc in the River Jordan".  He made a window at New Lady chapel, St. Savior, Southwark in 1832. Nixon also illustrated the work of Sir Walter Scott (1835). They created two windows for St. Edmunds, Lumbard St., London. They also installed a window in the east end of St Martin’s, Owston Ferry, Lincolnshire (1836). He also illustrated the Eglinton Tournament of 1839.

Ward and Nixon's studio was at 67 Frith Street, Soho. They created large window for St Stephen Coleman Street, London. They were commissioned to do the south transept of Westminster Abbey (1844–1848, removed 1902). Charles Winston wrote, 
"... the superiority of this work over its contemporaries, both here and abroad, that, had Mr. Nixon done nothing else, it would have been sufficient to entitle him to the respect of those who desire to see the true revival of a neglected and underrated branch of art."

In 1848, Thomas Ward died at age 71 and his part of the business was taken over by his nephew of the same name.

Perhaps the most prestigious stained glass commission of the 19th century, the re-glazing of the East Window of Lincoln Cathedral, went to Ward and Nixon in 1855. The largest 13th century window in the world, the simple harmony of the tracery in Geometric Decorated Gothic is the ultimate splendour in what has been acclaimed as "the finest cathedral in England". (John Ruskin and others). Ward and Nixon used a conservative design, its overall appearance being in keeping with the date of the stonework and drawing for effect on the visual texture of the variations within its formal arrangement and the glorious luminescence of its colour.

In the 1857 Nixon died and his pupil, Henry Hughes, became the partner of Thomas Ward, and the business was renamed Ward and Hughes.

Gallery

Works by Nixon 
 St Mary Denton, Norfolk
 North-East Lincolnshire, Owston Ferry, Isle of Axholme (1836)
 two east stained glass windows for St Mary's Church, Eastwell, Kent that represent the events in the history of Christ and Mary (1846). 
Resurrection windows at Church of the Assumption of the Blessed Virgin Mary, Redenhall (1846). 
 window for St James' Church, Stert, Wiltshire (1846).  
 windows for the church at Homerton,, London (1846).
window for Church of St John-at-Hackney (1847).  
 St. Mary, Thorpe, Surrey (1847). 
 St Illogan, Illogan, Cornwall (1847).  
two eastern windows for the parish church of St. George, Guiana (1848). 
Chichester Cathedral (1848). 
 St Paul's Church, Shadwell (1848). 
Church of St John-at-Hackney (1848). 
 windows to Norwich Cathedral (1851). 
 St. Paul's, Shadwell (1851). 
 All Saints Cathedral, Kingston (1852).
 Glass for St Giles' Catholic Church, Cheadle (1853). 
 Benefield (1853).
Windows at St Nicholas Church, Brighton (1854). 
two memorial windows for Armagh Cathedral (1855). 
St. Andrews Church, Tur Langton, Leicestershire (1855).
 east window of Lincoln Cathedral (1855).

References

External links 
 
 British Museum - James Henry Nixon
 The Tempest - James Henry Nixon
 Marmion - Walter Scott

1802 births
1857 deaths
History of London
British illustrators